The 1916–17 Indiana Hoosiers men's basketball team represented Indiana University. Their head coach was Guy Lowman, who was in his 1st and only year. The team played its home games at the Old Assembly Hall before moving to the newly constructed Men's Gymnasium in Bloomington, Indiana, and was a member of the Western Conference.

The Hoosiers finished the regular season with an overall record of 13–6 and a conference record of 3–5, finishing 5th in the Western Conference.

Roster

Schedule/Results

|-
!colspan=8| Regular Season
|-

References

Indiana
Indiana Hoosiers men's basketball seasons
1916 in sports in Indiana
1917 in sports in Indiana